= Samaswasam (scheme) =

Welfare program in Kerala, India

The Samaswasam Scheme is a financial assistance program by the Government of Kerala, designed to support patients with various chronic medical conditions. The scheme is divided into multiple components:

- Samaswasam I (Dialysis): Provides Rs. 1,100/month to patients with kidney failure who require dialysis at least once a month. Applicants must belong to a Below Poverty Line (BPL) category. As of 2024, there are 350 beneficiaries under this scheme.
- Samaswasam II (Kidney/Liver Transplantation): Offers Rs. 1,000/month for up to 5 years for individuals undergoing kidney or liver transplants, with income limits under Rs. 1 lakh. As of 2024, there are 350 beneficiaries.
- Samaswasam III (Hemophilia): Assists individuals with hemophilia, providing Rs. 1,000/month. There are no income restrictions. As of 2024, there are 1483 beneficiaries.
- Samaswasam IV (Sickle Cell Anemia): Provides Rs. 2,000/month to non-tribal patients with sickle cell disease. As of 2024, there are 210 beneficiaries.

In 2022-23, approximately ₹ 3 crores was distributed to the beneficiaries under this program.
